Octavio Frias de Oliveira (5 August 1912 in Rio de Janeiro – 29 April 2007 in São Paulo) was a Brazilian businessman who gained recognition for turning newspaper Folha de S. Paulo – acquired by himself and partner Carlos Caldeira in August 1962 – into one of the most influential Brazilian media organizations. The newspaper became the cornerstone for a conglomerate called Grupo Folha.

Early life
Eighth amongst the nine children of Luiz Torres de Oliveira and Elvira Frias de Oliveira, Octavio Frias de Oliveira was born in Copacabana (Rio de Janeiro) on 5 August 1912. The Oliveiras were a traditional family in  Rio; Frias' great-grandfather was the Baron of Itambi, an influential political figure in the Late Imperial period.

In 1918, Luiz Oliveira, by then a judge in Queluz (SP), took a leave of absence from his law career to work with entrepreneur Jorge Street. He moved his family to São Paulo, and Frias was enrolled in Colegio São Luis, an elite school.

Work as a civil servant and the 1932 Revolution
Frias' first job came in 1926, as an office boy with Companhia de Gás de São Paulo, which, like most Brazilian utilities of that age, was a British-owned corporation. After three months, he was promoted and became an accounting machine typist. In 1930, he transferred into the São Paulo State government's revenue service, to lead a team charged with the mechanization of tax forms. To supplement his income, Frias sold radio sets after work. By 1940, he had become a director in the State Civil Administration Service, handling the Accounting and Planning areas.

Even being skeptical towards politics, Frias joined the rebel army as a volunteer during the 1932 Constitutional Revolution. He was stationed for two months in the Cunha region, upstate in the Paraíba River valley, and spent his 20th birthday in the trenches; Frias took part in firefights and saw the death of some of his comrades in arms.

Banco Nacional Imobiliário and other activities previous to Folha

Frias became an entrepreneur in the 1940s. In 1943, he was one of the founding partners of BNI (Banco Nacional Imobiliário, later Banco Nacional Interamericano), under Orozimbo Roxo Loureiro. As head of the property desk, he financed the construction of more than a dozen buildings, one of which, the Copan building, designed by Oscar Niemeyer, would become a São Paulo landmark.

Unhappy with the bank's management, Frias left BNI in 1955; six months later, the bank was taken over by Bradesco, after going into liquidation.

In 1953, Frias had created his own company, Transaco (Transações Comerciais), one of the first Brazilian brokers to sell shares directly to the public. He also translated into Portuguese Frank Bettger's sales best-seller “How I Raised Myself from Failure to Success in Selling”, and created sales courses up to then unheard of in Brazil, to train a team that peaked at more than 500 salespeople.

By that period, Frias, then a widower, got married for the second time, to Dagmar de Arruda Camargo, who had a daughter, Maria Helena, from a previous marriage. The couple had three children (Otavio, Luiz and Maria Cristina).

In 1954, he bought a small ranch outside São José dos Campos (in rural São Paulo), and turned it into poultry farming. The ranch expanded into a big poultry operation, Granja Itambi, which at a certain point held two million chickens; currently, it operates as a cattle ranch.

In 1961, he joined entrepreneur Carlos Caldeira Filho to build the first interstate bus terminal in São Paulo, the first of its kind in Brazil. The terminal would operate as the main departure and arrival point for long-distance bus trips in São Paulo up to 1982, when it was supplanted by the Tietê Bus Terminal, in Northern São Paulo.

Folha
On 13 August 1962, Frias and Caldeira bought Folha de S. Paulo, which vied with “Diário de São Paulo” for the second position in the São Paulo newspaper market, then led by O Estado de S. Paulo. Then, Folha was going through serious financial difficulties.

The new owners spent the next few years investing in retooling Folha, from a financial, managerial and industrial standpoint. From 1974 on, they expanded their reforms to the editorial area. The newspaper, who early on supported the 1964 military coup, glimpsed the military rulers' interest in opening up the political system, and went with it for the following 10 years. Folha supported the political opening, opened its pages to all political currents and its news coverage adopted a more critical stance.

From late 1983, Folha led all other Brazilian media vehicles in supporting the popular campaign for direct presidential elections, and in 1986 became the Brazilian daily with the largest circulation, a position it still holds.

In the mid-1980s, Frias started to transfer executive control of the newspaper to his two sons, Luiz Frias and Otavio Frias Filho, respectively the CEO and Chief Editorial Officer of Grupo Folha.

In 1991, Frias and Caldeira decided to dissolve their partnership; Frias kept the media side of the joint company and Caldeira got the property side and the other businesses. In 1995, one year after reaching the one-million copies mark for its Sunday edition, Folha put into operation the Centro Tecnológico Gráfico-Folha, a state of the art printing plant valued at US$120 million. In 1996, Group Folha created Universo Online, the leading Brazilian Internet content and access provider.

Death
In November 2006, after suffering a fall at home, Frias went into surgery for removing a cranial hematoma. He was discharged late the same year, but his clinical condition worsened and he suffered a kidney collapse. Otavio Frias de Oliveira died in São Paulo on 29 April 2007, at age 94.

Recognition

In February 2000, for the 79th anniversary of Folha, Frias was honored in a joint Congressional session. In 2002, FIAM (Faculdades Integradas Alcântara Machado) created the Octavio Frias de Oliveira Journalism chair, with monthly seminars and made Frias a Professor honoris causa. In September 2006, the São Paulo State government granted him the Ordem do Ipiranga, the highest State commend.

After Frias' death, the São Paulo city hall gave his name to a bypass connecting Jornalista Roberto Marinho avenue to the Pinheiros expressway, in Southern São Paulo. The bypass was opened to traffic in May 2008. In the same month, the São Paulo state government opened the Instituto do Câncer de São Paulo Octavio Frias de Oliveira, the largest cancer treatment center in Latin America, in Western São Paulo.

The institute and Folha partnered to create the Octavio Frias de Oliveira Award, to honor and support Brazilian efforts to prevent and fight cancer, and disseminate knowledge about the disease.

References

1912 births
2007 deaths
Brazilian newspaper publishers (people)
Brazilian media executives
Businesspeople from Rio de Janeiro (city)
Brazilian journalists
Octavio
20th-century journalists